Leon Robert Gauchat Jr. (March 5, 1921 – October 28, 1971) was an American professional basketball player. He played for the Tri-Cities Blackhawks and the Rochester Royals in the National Basketball League spanning about one season in total. In his post-basketball career he became a dentist.

References

1921 births
1971 deaths
20th-century dentists
American dentists
American men's basketball players
Basketball players from Buffalo, New York
Canisius Golden Griffins men's basketball players
Guards (basketball)
Rochester Royals players
Tri-Cities Blackhawks players
United States Navy personnel of World War II